Division I is the third level division of the Football Federation of Sri Lanka. 12 or 15 teams represent this division divided into two groups. The top team of each group of this division is promoted to Kit Premier League while last team of both groups is relegated to Sri Lanka Football Division II.

League structure
Structure of this league has changed on yearly basis most of time since this tournament is sponsored by various sponsors on a yearly basis. Dialog Telekom (2008/2009, 2007/2008, 2006/2007), CEAT tires (2009/2010), Unique apparels (2010/2011) are some of the past sponsors of the tournament. Number of participating teams were 12 in 2008/2009 and 2009/2010. 

After the group stages the top 2 teams from each group play in a semifinals stage. The winners of the semifinals then played in a finals to determine the champion of division I. The top two teams (the finalists) are promoted to the premier division while the bottom teams of each group are relegated to the lower division.

History

References
http://www.srilankafootball.com/division1.html

2
Sri